Platycerus is a genus of stag beetles (Lucanidae), belonging to the subfamily Lucaninae.

Species
 Platycerus caprea (De Geer, 1774)
 Platycerus caraboides (Linnaeus, 1758)
 Platycerus caucasicus Parry, 1864
 Platycerus cribripennis Van Dyke, 1928
 Platycerus delagrangei Fairmaire, 1892
 Platycerus depressus LeConte, 1850
 Platycerus hongwonpyoi Imura & Choe, 1989
 Platycerus marginalis Casey, 1897
 Platycerus oregonensis Westwood, 1844
 Platycerus primigenius E. Weise, 1960
 Platycerus pseudocaprea Paulus, 1970
 Platycerus spinifer Schaufuss, 1862
 Platycerus quercus (Weber)

References 

 Biolib

Lucaninae
Beetles of Europe
Lucanidae genera